Aqqum, also known as Tyshkanbay, (Aqqūm, اققۇم; , Tyshkanbay) is a town in Aktobe Region, west Kazakhstan.

References

Aktobe Region
Cities and towns in Kazakhstan